The Monterey and Mexican Gulf Railroad was a railroad in Mexico that the Mexican Central Railway acquired control over in June 1901.  

The Railroad was established as a company in New York City on September 5, 1888. In the 1890s the railroad was said to be in a better financial position than its competitors and stood to make large profits once oil exploitation in the Gulf of Mexico began.

References

Defunct railway companies of Mexico
Railway companies disestablished in 1901
Railway companies established in 1888